José Manuel Rey Varela (born 31 December 1975 in Ferrol) is a Spanish People's Party (PPdeG) politician as well as a solicitor, former mayor of Ferrol the industrial city and naval station of Galicia and (Spain). He is also the current president of the Galician Federation of Municipalities and Provinces (FEGAMP) and is married to María Casal Pereira

References 

1975 births
Politicians from Galicia (Spain)
Government ministers of Galicia (Spain)
Living people
People's Party (Spain) politicians
Spanish Roman Catholics